Shortheath Common is a  biological Site of Special Scientific Interest east of Bordon in Hampshire. It is also a Local Nature Reserve and a Special Area of Conservation.

The common has areas of bracken, woodland, heath and a pond, but its main ecological interest is a large valley mire. Much of it is covered by Sphagnum mosses, but there are also many vascular plants, such as velvet  bent and the insectivorous round-leaved sundew. The invertebrates are also of particular interest, including 23 breeding species of dragonfly.

References

 

Local Nature Reserves in Hampshire
Sites of Special Scientific Interest in Hampshire
Special Areas of Conservation in England